My People, My Homeland is a 2020 Chinese anthology comedy film. The film consists of five short stories that take place in Beijing, Guizhou, Shaanxi, Hangzhou, and Shenyang. The film was a financial success, grossing over $422.3 million worldwide. The film is a sequel to My People, My Country (2019), and it is followed by another sequel, My Country, My Parents (2021).

Story

Beijing Good People

An interesting story about Zhang Beijing helping his uncle's treatment in Beijing.

UFO fell from the sky

The UFO appeared in Afu Village in Qiannan, Guizhou. Reporter Tang, scientists Dong Xuexue and Xiao Qin of the "Re-entry Science" project team went deep into the village to investigate. Village chief Wang Shouzheng and businessman Wang Chuqi warmly welcomed the three, but during the investigation, there were others who had other ideas.

Last Lesson

Lao Fan suffers from Alzheimer's disease. His children sought help from Wangxi Village and wanted to repeat the last lesson of 1992 to help Teacher Fan recover his memory. The students of Teacher Fan did their best to recover the "children" and the downpour.

The Way Home

"Sand Apple" distributor Qiao Shulin and e-commerce anchor Yan Feiyan went back to their hometown when they returned to their alma mater to participate in the celebration. The touching story of Qiao Shulin who loves bragging and Yan Feiyan who dislikes him.

Ma Liang

Ma Liang was born in a mountain village in the northeast. He gave up his studies at a key Russian art school and returned to his hometown to help his hometown develop. In order not to let his wife Qiuxia find out, he and the villagers are pretending to live in Russia. By chance, Qiuxia went to Ma Liang's hometown.

Release 
The film became the twelfth highest-grossing film in China with box office earnings at RMB 2.83 billion.

Accolades

See also 
My People, My Country
My Country, My Parents

References

External links 

2020 films
Chinese anthology films
IMAX films
Chinese comedy films
Films directed by Xu Zheng
Films directed by Ning Hao
Films directed by Chen Sicheng
Films directed by Chao Deng
Films directed by Baimei Yu
Films directed by Da-Mo Peng
Films directed by Fei Yan